Sikandar Sultan Raja is a retired Pakistani civil servant who serves as the Chief Election Commissioner of Pakistan, in office since January 2020. He belongs to the Pakistan Administrative Service and is batchmates with Rizwan Ahmed, Hussain Asghar, Fawad Hasan Fawad and Jawad Rafique Malik.

Raja retired from civil service in BPS-22 grade. He has the honor of having served at the top bureaucratic positions such as the Railways Secretary, Petroleum Secretary, SAFFRON Secretary, Federal Secretary Aviation and Chief Secretary of both Azad Kashmir and Gilgit-Baltistan. Raja is the son-in-law of Saeed Mehdi, the former Principal Secretary to the Prime Minister of Pakistan and Chief Secretary Sindh. Sikandar was appointed Chief election  commissioner by Former Prime MinisterImran Khan in January 2020.

Family
Raja's father remained a Major in Pakistan Army. Raja has four brothers and four sisters. The eldest brother by the name of Zafar Sultan Raja is a retired Colonel from Pakistan Army. The second eldest brother Mazhar Sultan Raja has an agrarian background. The third eldest brother is Azhar Sultan Raja who is a Civil Engineer retired as Chief Engineer from C & W Department (Punjab). The youngest brother Fakhar Sultan Raja is a CSP Officer who hails from Pakistan Police Service and currently posted as DIG Pakistan Motorways. 

Raja’s eldest brother in law Nisar Ahmed Malik was a Mechanical Engineer and retired as Superintending Engineer from Irrigation and Power Department (Punjab). His second brother in law Nasrullah Ranjha was Additional Session Judge. His third brother in law Zafar Javed Malik was retired as Deputy Commissioner Faisalabad and his fourth brother in law Imtiaz Ahmed Dev was a CSP Officer from Inland Revenue Services (IRS) and retired as Commissioner from IRS.

He is also related to Amir Ali Ahmad Chief Commissioner Islamabad, Zohaib Ranjha Former SP Investigation (Lahore), Muhammad Ali Former DC Faisalabad, SSP Sarfraz Virk Former DPO Jhang and SP Bilal Zafar Former DPO Chiniot. Raja is the son-in-law of Saeed Mehdi; a former top bureaucrat who served as Principal Secretary to PM Nawaz Sharif. Raja's wife, Rabab Sikandar, is a serving Customs official. Raja has two sons and one daughter.

Career & education
Raja was born in a village near Bhera in district Sargodha. He got his earlier education from government high school Bhera and later went on to do his FSC from Cadet College Hasan Abdal and then went on to King Edward Medical University to earn a bachelor's degree in medicine. He also did LLB from Punjab University. He was then inducted into the Pakistan Administrative Service and started off his career with his first post as Assistant Commissioner Islamabad in 1989.

Raja has served on key positions, including Deputy Commissioner Islamabad and Punjab's provincial Secretary of Communications & Works (C&W), Services and General Administration (S&GAD), and Local Government before briefly serving as ACS (G) in Punjab. He has also served as Chief Secretary for the provinces of Gilgit Baltistan as well as  Azad Jammu Kashmir. He remained as Director General Immigration and Passport under the administration of Prime Minister Nawaz Sharif.

Raja was promoted to the rank of Federal Secretary in 2017. He served in the important position of Secretary Petroleum from April 2017 till August 2018. In November 2018, Prime Minister Imran Khan appointed Raja as the Railways Secretary of Pakistan and Chairman Pakistan Railways. He served as Railways Secretary and Chairman Pakistan Railways until December 2019. In January 2020, Imran Khan appointed him to the all-important post of Chief Election Commissioner of Pakistan.

References

Pakistani civil servants
Government of Pakistan
Year of birth missing (living people)
Living people